The 1934 Iowa gubernatorial election was held on November 6, 1934. Incumbent Democrat Clyde L. Herring defeated Republican nominee Dan W. Turner with 51.75% of the vote.

General election

Candidates
Major party candidates
Clyde L. Herring, Democratic 
Dan W. Turner, Republican

Other candidates
Wallace M. Short, Farmer–Labor
L. J. U. Smay, Prohibition
Arthur W. Saarman, Socialist
Ira R. Meade, Communist

Results

References

1934
Iowa
Gubernatorial